Zhang Hengyun (born 25 October 1974) is a former Chinese sprinter who mainly competed over 400 metres.

Achievements

Personal bests

References
 http://www.all-athletics.com/fr/node/110878
 

1974 births
Living people
Chinese female sprinters
Asian Games medalists in athletics (track and field)
Sportspeople from Jiangsu
Athletes (track and field) at the 1994 Asian Games
Athletes (track and field) at the 1998 Asian Games
Asian Games gold medalists for China
Asian Games silver medalists for China
Medalists at the 1994 Asian Games
Medalists at the 1998 Asian Games
20th-century Chinese women